Peter Telep (born April 8, 1965) is an American author, screenwriter, and educator who has collaborated with the late Tom Clancy. He has written over 50 books, and written scripts for multiple television shows. He is currently a teacher at The University of Central Florida.

Biography
Telep was born in Yonkers, New York, but moved to Long Island at a young age, where he lived an "average childhood". He attended Southampton College, where he did most of his undergraduate work, but dropped out during his senior year. After spending a few years in Los Angeles, working on television shows, he returned to school at The University of Central Florida where he earned his undergraduate and graduate degrees. He currently resides in Orlando, Florida and teaches composition, scriptwriting, and creative writing courses at The University of Central Florida. Telep enjoys fishing and is a certified cycling instructor.

Written works
The following was taken from Mr. Telep's official website:

Books
The Squire series
Squire (1995)
Squire's Blood (1995)
Squire's Honor (1996)
Space: Above and Beyond
Space: Above and Beyond (1995)
Demolition Winter (1997)
The Descent series
Descent (1999)
Stealing Thunder (1999)
Equinox (1999)
Wing Commander
Wing Commander (1999)
Wing Commander - Junior Novelization (1999)
Pilgrim Stars (1999)
Red Planet
Red Planet (2001)
Brothers in Arms series (as Ben Weaver)
Brothers in Arms (2001)
Rebels in Arms (2002)
Patriots in Arms (2003)
Night Angel 9 series
Night Angel 9 (2001)
Playing With Fire (2001)
Life Flight (2001)
Force 5 Recon series (as P.W. Storm)
Deployment: Pakistan (2003)
Deployment: North Korea (2004)
Deployment: Philippines (2004)
Armored Corps series (as Pete Callahan)
Armored Corps (2005)
Engage and Destroy (2005)
Attack by Fire (2006)
The Mercenaries series (as P.W. Storm)
Blood Diamonds (2006)
Thunderkill (2007)
Mad Dogs and Englishmen (2008)
Special Forces Afghanistan
Direct Action (2008)
Critical Action (2009)
EndWar series
Tom Clancy's EndWar: The Missing (2013)

Screenplays
In the Heat of the Night
A Final Arrangement (Season 4, Episode 10)
The Legend of Prince Valiant
The Crossbow (Season 2, Episode 38)

References

External links

1965 births
Living people
Southampton College alumni
University of Central Florida faculty
University of Central Florida alumni
American male novelists
American male screenwriters
Novelists from Florida
Screenwriters from Florida
Writers from Orlando, Florida
People from Yonkers, New York
Novelists from New York (state)
Screenwriters from New York (state)